Grafton Tanner is an American author and academic. His work focuses  on Big Tech, nostalgia, neoliberalism, and education.

Books
The Hours Have Lost Their Clock: The Politics of Nostalgia (Repeater Books, 2021)
The Circle of the Snake: Nostalgia and Utopia in the Age of Big Tech (Zer0 Books, 2020)
Babbling Corpse: Vaporwave and the Commodification of Ghosts (Zer0 Books, 2016)

References

External links
 Official website

Living people
Year of birth missing (living people)